The Manette Bridge was a steel truss bridge that spanned the Port Washington Narrows in Bremerton, Washington, USA. It connected the community of Manette, Washington to downtown Bremerton. Although it is not part of a numbered state highway, it is one of four bridges specifically designated by state law to be maintained by the Washington Department of Transportation.

Ferry crossing

Before the bridge was opened in 1930 the trip was made by ferry. Between 1916 and 1930, the Mosquito Fleet ferry Pioneer serviced the crossing between Bremerton and Manette for most of the time. Sometimes the Urania, a passenger-only ferry, filled in. Missing the last ferry meant a long trip around Dyes Inlet through Chico, Silverdale and Tracyton on mostly unimproved roads.

Bridge history

The bridge was built as the Bremerton-Manette Bridge, a toll bridge constructed by the East Bremerton Improvement Club to assist families in commuting from the eastside of Bremerton, Washington to the westside. Locals went door to door selling stock, raising approximately $200,000 for the bridge.

Construction on the bridge began October 1929, by the Union Bridge Company of Portland, Oregon. The bridge opened on June 21, 1930, amid much celebration. Among those present was Jane Garrison, the 106-year-old granddaughter of Chief Seattle.

Originally the bridge was a toll bridge, with tolls of 25 cents per car, and 5 cents per pedestrian. The Washington Toll Bridge Authority purchased the bridge in 1937. The tolls generated on the bridge enabled the Washington Toll Bridge Authority to recover the purchase price within a year and a half. The toll was lifted January 28, 1939. The last person to pay a toll on the bridge was J.C Bartholet, at 3:59 pm that day. At 5:30  pm, State Senator Lulu Haddon (D-Bremerton) cut a symbolic ribbon, opening the bridge to toll-free traffic. The bridge remained toll-free until the nearby Warren Avenue Bridge opened as a toll bridge. Since traffic would use the toll-free Manette Bridge instead, tolls were reinstated from November 25, 1958 to October 24, 1972.

In 1949, the timber approaches were replaced with concrete and steel components. The entire timber roadway deck was replaced around the same time. The main span thru truss and deck trusses are from the original 1930s bridge. A wider bridge across the Port Washington Narrows, the Warren Avenue Bridge, was opened in 1958 as an alternative to the Manette Bridge.

The Manette Bridge, which was first built in 1930, was listed as structurally deficient and functionally obsolete. In early 2010, construction began on a replacement bridge. The new Manette Bridge opened on November 10, 2011.

References

https://web.archive.org/web/20120405121115/http://www.kitsapsun.com/news/2010/jun/20/manette-bridge-timeline/
Jensen, Erv (1988). Manette Pioneering. Manette History Club, pp. 5, 11–14. 88-060804.

External links

Article on HistoryLink

Bridges completed in 1930
Bridges completed in 1949
Bremerton, Washington
Transportation buildings and structures in Kitsap County, Washington
State highways in Washington (state)
Road bridges in Washington (state)
Former toll bridges in Washington (state)
Steel bridges in the United States
1930 establishments in Washington (state)